Chongren County is a county of Jiangxi province, People's Republic of China. It is under the jurisdiction of the prefecture-level city of Fuzhou.

Administrative divisions
In the present, Chongren County has 7 towns and 8 townships.
7 towns

8 townships

Demographics 

Climate

Notes and references

External links
  Government site - 

 
County-level divisions of Jiangxi
Fuzhou, Jiangxi